Helena Cavallier (May 5, 1855 – April 15, 1920) was a silent film and stage actress, known for her characters in Pela Vitória dos Clubes Carnavalescos (1909), Os Dois Proscritos ou a Restauração de Portugal em 1640 (1909) or Mil Adultérios (1910).

She died on April 15, 1920 in Rio de Janeiro, Brazil.

Theatre
 A Morgadinha de Val de Flôr  (1879) 
 As doutoras (1897)

Selected filmography
 Noivado de Sangue (1909)
 Pela Vitória dos Clubes Carnavalescos (1909)
 Os Dois Proscritos ou a Restauração de Portugal em 1640 (1909)
 Mil Adultérios (1910)

References

External links

 http://m.filmweb.pl/person/Helena+Cavallier-646010

1855 births
1920 deaths
Spanish stage actresses
Spanish silent film actresses